John Marshall High School is located in Rochester, Minnesota, United States and is part of Independent School District #535.  The school is named for the longest serving Chief Justice in Supreme Court history, John Marshall.  It is one of three public High Schools in Rochester.  Enrollment was 1,727 students during the 20182019 school year, in grades 912.

History
John Marshall High School is located in Rochester, Minnesota. It is the oldest public high school in the city being established in 1958 to accommodate the growing population as Rochester High School was no longer sufficient in size to house the student population.

In 1953, city leaders began to consider sites for the new high school that was to become John Marshall. According to a Rochester Post-Bulletin article: "[t]he city council and school board favored a Soldiers Field location, but were unsure the city could sell a portion of the park to the school board. The state attorney general ruled it could, and things started heating up. In March 1954, the Legion Post voted unanimously to oppose the location. In April, the city council declared a portion of Soldiers Field no longer needed for park purposes. Mayor Claude H. "Boney" McQuillan, a former pro boxer and Green Bay Packers player, opposed the location and vetoed the resolution. The council overrode the veto only to be countered by the mayor's refusal to sign a deed to transfer the land title. The argument went to court, where District Judge Arnold Hatfield ruled the veto was in order. John Marshall High School in northwest Rochester emerged from this turbulent beginning."

Often referred to as "JM", John Marshall adopted "The Rocket" as its official mascot and red and black as the official school colors. "A mark of excellence" is the motto of the school.  After years of discussion, major renovations began to expand the institution's space and upgrade its facilities in the summer of 2005. Notably, a modern science wing was completed in the summer of 2006. The entire reconstruction project was completed in 2008, when John Marshall celebrated its 50th anniversary.

Academics
JM has a variety of Advanced Placement, honors-level classes, and post-secondary enrollment options available to its students.

The school has a Math Team, Science Olympiad team, Business Professionals of America, and Science Fair, with participants and teams routinely advancing to state, national, and international levels of competition.

The school also has a variety of other academic and extracurricular organizations, including National Honor Society, a robotics team, a chess team, a Latin club, amongst many others.

The graduation rate in 2017 was 91%.

Athletics
Rochester John Marshall is a member of the Big Nine Conference.

The John Marshall boys' hockey team is the only hockey team from the Big 9 to ever win the Minnesota State Hockey Tournament, in 1977.

The John Marshall Football Team won State Championships in 1973 and 1974.

John Marshall has an intracity rivalry with Rochester Mayo High School. With the establishment of Century High School in 1997 a new rivalry also began to form.

Arts

The bands at John Marshall are the Concert Band (ninth grade band), Symphonic Band (standard band for tenth graders and up), and Symphonic Winds (Honors band). In the fall, the Symphonic Winds and the Symphonic Band combine to make the John Marshall Marching Band. The marching band plays at the football team’s home games. The John Marshall Marching Band won state competitions in the years 19801984, 19871992, and 2004present.

John Marshall also has two orchestras, Art Club, Jazz Ensemble, Color Guard, Yearbook committee, Newspaper committee, and other fine arts groups.

Notable alumni
 Eric Butorac – professional tennis player
 Tyler Cain – professional basketball player
 Matthew Hurt – college basketball player
 Shjon Podein – NHL hockey player 
 Marcus Sherels – NFL cornerback
 Darrell Thompson – NFL running back
 Igor Vovkovinskiy - Tallest person in US 
 Doug Zmolek – NHL hockey player

References

External links
John Marshall High School website

High schools in Rochester, Minnesota
Educational institutions established in 1958
1958 establishments in Minnesota
Public high schools in Minnesota